Pobeda is a station on the First Line of the Samara Metro. It opened on 26 December 1987 as one of the four initial stations on the line. It is in the Sovetsky district of Samara. The name comes from the street on which the station is situated, Ulitsa Pobedy (Victory Street).

References

External links
 Official station page

Samara Metro stations
Railway stations in Russia opened in 1987
Railway stations located underground in Russia